Cello Metal! is the sixth studio album by Tina Guo. It featured John 5 and Al Di Meola and was released on 4 August 2015.

Track listing

Release history

References

External links
Cello Metal
 Tina Guo – Cello Metal
 Cello Metal Tina Guo

2015 albums
Tina Guo albums
Sony Music albums
Groove metal albums
Symphonic metal albums
Thrash metal albums